KPBS Public Media is a not-for-profit organization licensed to San Diego State University in San Diego, California, United States, with three sections:

 KPBS (TV), a television station (channel 15)
 KPBS-FM, a radio station (89.5)
 KPBS-Digital, a news website

Journalism hub
In 2018, KPBS held discussions with CapRadio, KQED in San Francisco, and KPCC in Pasadena to form a "journalist hub", following a recent initiative of NPR to deepen collaboration between NPR and member stations on journalism, fundraising and digital platforms. As the stations expand their work together, they aim to "have less redundancy in our coverage and more proficiency", according to Joe Barr, chief content officer at CapRadio. The stations want to report on state-wide events collectively instead of duplicating efforts, for example when reporting on state's wildfires.

References

San Diego State University